The third season of the American drama television series 24, also known as Day 3, premiered in the United States on Fox on October 28, 2003, and aired its season finale on May 25, 2004. The storyline starts and ends at 1:00 pm. The season premiere originally aired without commercial interruption, and has an extended running time of approximately 51 minutes, as opposed to the standard 43 minutes.

Season overview
The third season is set 3 years after season two. It takes place primarily in Los Angeles but also in northern Mexico when Jack Bauer meets a family of drug dealers. Throughout the day, Jack Bauer and President David Palmer attempt to stop the release of a deadly virus by Stephen Saunders – a former government agent.

Like the previous two seasons, there are two main acts in the plot:
 The first act deals with the response to an imminent biological threat which is expected to be carried out unless a highly valued prisoner is released, which reveals that the entire terrorist threat was a plot to access the real virus being auctioned in Mexico.
 In the second act, Jack and the other CTU agents race against time to recover the virus from a radicalized agent who is using it to kill civilians and manipulate foreign policy.

Major subplots
 Jack Bauer fights against the heroin addiction that he incurred to maintain his cover.
 President Palmer faces scandal during his re-election campaign involving his girlfriend, whom he met through her job as his personal physician.
 Tony Almeida and Michelle Dessler struggle to prioritize national security over their love for each other.
 Jack disapproves of the relationship that is unfolding between Kim Bauer and Chase Edmunds.
 CTU staff members clash with Chloe O'Brian's personality.
 Palmer is forced to cover up a murder when his ex-wife Sherry Palmer greatly oversteps her bounds.
 Kim Bauer tries to prove herself fully competent even though Jack gave her the CTU job to keep an eye on her.
 Jack Bauer finally kills Nina Myers to get revenge for Teri's death.
 Stephen Saunders controls the actions of President Palmer under the threat of releasing the virus if his demands aren't met. One of the demands is the murder of Ryan Chappelle.
 CTU staff members, including Chase Edmunds and Adam Kaufman, deal with personal problems that cause some to question their fitness for the job.

Summary
Day 3 sees CTU deal with a deadly virus threat that would be released in Los Angeles. Jack's nemesis Nina Myers is also seen, while he is trying to break his heroin addiction after his undercover operation with Ramon and Hector Salazar. Jack's colleagues suspect that his difficulty quitting is related to the death of his wife Teri at the end of the first season. Jack has a new protege in tow, Chase Edmunds, but things take a turn for the worse when it is revealed Chase is seeing his daughter Kim, and it causes tension among the three of them.

President Palmer is seeking re-election against Senator John Keeler, but his campaign turns sour after one of his major backers, Alan Milliken, discovers that Palmer's brother, Wayne, has been sleeping with Julia Milliken, Alan's wife. Palmer's campaign suffers a major blow when revelations come out about his girlfriend and personal physician Anne Packard. The president turns to his ex-wife Sherry to deal with Milliken. Sherry takes it all a step too far when she kills Milliken by not allowing him his medication, which he needs to stay alive. Despite David Palmer's best cover-up efforts, Keeler uses it as leverage in the campaign. Toward the end of the day, Julia kills Sherry before taking her own life, and Palmer decides not to seek re-election.

Back at CTU, it turns out that Tony Almeida, Gael Ortega and Jack have been working undercover on a sting operation. Chase is initially unaware of the situation and attempts to "rescue" Jack, who is being held captive by the Salazars. Tony recovers from a gunshot wound to the neck, to return as head of CTU, with many doubting his abilities.

Nina comes in just as Jack and the Salazars are trying to get hold of the virus from Michael Amador, but he plays them all for fools. After Nina is captured by CTU and interrogated, she makes a daring escape attempt only to be found by Kim. Jack comes in and finally gets revenge for the death of his wife Teri.

Amador meets with his accomplice Marcus Alvers, who later plants some of the virus in a hotel ventilation system. When Michelle Dessler captures Alvers, he reveals that the mastermind of the day's events is a man from Jack's past named Stephen Saunders. Gael is killed soon after being exposed to the virus and Michelle has to deal with the threat at the hotel, as well as the unruly guests who soon discover the deadly truth. Saunders contacts President Palmer and gives him a series of assignments, one of which is the murder of Regional Division Director Ryan Chappelle. Jack and Chase try desperately to capture Saunders, but in the end, Jack is forced to kill Chappelle and hand over his body as proof.

Once Saunders is captured, Jack uses all means possible to stop the threat posed by the remaining vials. This ends with Jack cutting off Chase's hand in order to access the viral delivery devices. Physicians attempt to reattach his hand as the season draws to a close. The final scene of season 3 shows Jack Bauer having an emotional breakdown as a result of the day's events until he is once again enlisted by CTU to interrogate one of the day's suspects. The day ends with Jack on his way back to work.

Characters

Starring
 Kiefer Sutherland as Jack Bauer (24 episodes)
 Elisha Cuthbert as Kim Bauer (24 episodes)
 Carlos Bernard as Tony Almeida (24 episodes)
 Reiko Aylesworth as Michelle Dessler (24 episodes)
 James Badge Dale as Chase Edmunds (24 episodes)
 Dennis Haysbert as President David Palmer (24 episodes)

Special guest star
 Penny Johnson Jerald as Sherry Palmer (10 episodes)

Guest starring

Episodes

Production
The third to last episode showed F18 fighters destroying a helicopter from the air. This scene was filmed on location and required extensive collaboration between the film crew, the United States Marine Corps and the Federal Aviation Administration. Efforts were made to show the response to a virus outbreak realistically. Anne Cofell, a researcher for 24, consulted with a virologist and the Centers for Disease Control. The writers originally planned to incorporate a real virus into the plot but ended up using a fictitious one when researchers doubted that any real virus would be that deadly.

Trailer
The initial trailer promoting season 3 was much longer than the trailer promoting season 2. It touches on many of the early plot points including the threat to release the virus, Jack's heroin addiction and the relationship between Kim Bauer and Chase Edmunds.

Reception
The third season of 24 received "generally favorable reviews", scoring a Metacritic rating of 72/100 based on 14 reviews. On Rotten Tomatoes, the season has an approval rating of 93% with an average score of 7.1 out of 10 based on 14 reviews. The website's critical consensus reads, "24s third day marks the series' most ruthless season yet with a breathless race to avert chemical catastrophe, a myriad of shocking surprises, and an unnerving disregard for treating any character as safe."

Empire ranked "Day 3: 6:00 a.m. – 7:00 a.m." as the best ever 24 episode saying "As Jack puts a bullet into Ryan's head and weeps, the clock at the end of the episode remains silent, capping off the most emotional and darkest hour in 24's history."

Award nominations
24 won four Emmy awards for its third season and also, the Golden Globe Award for Best Television Series – Drama, after being nominated 3 times in a row.

Home media releases

References

External links
 

24 (TV series)
2003 American television seasons
2004 American television seasons
Bioterrorism in fiction
Works about Mexican drug cartels